Porter Heights may refer to:
Porter Heights, New Zealand, ski resort near Christchurch
Porter Heights, Texas, census-designated place (CDP)